K. M. Abraham (27 March 1919 – 5 September 2006) was a member of the 4th Lok Sabha of India. He represented the Kottayam constituency of Kerala and was a member of the Communist Party of India (Marxist) political party. He was in office from March 1967 to December 1970.

Education & background
Abraham was educated in English High School, Puthupally and was a full-time political and trade union worker. He was associated with Indian National Congress prior to joining the Communist Party in 1942. He was imprisoned for more than four years on account of political activities.

See also
List of members of the 15th Lok Sabha of India

References 

India MPs 1967–1970
Politicians from Kottayam
1919 births
2006 deaths
Lok Sabha members from Kerala
Communist Party of India (Marxist) politicians from Kerala
Kerala MLAs 1980–1982
Malayali politicians
Kerala politicians